Yeti Airlines Flight 691 was a scheduled domestic passenger flight from Kathmandu to Pokhara in Nepal. On 15 January 2023, the aircraft being operated on the route, an ATR 72 flown by Yeti Airlines, crashed while landing at Pokhara, killing all 72 occupants on board. It is the deadliest accident involving an ATR 72.

Accident 

The flight took off from Kathmandu's Tribhuvan International Airport at 10:33 am NST. It crashed on the bank of the Seti Gandaki River while on final approach to landing at Pokhara International Airport. A video filmed from the ground showed the aircraft banking steeply to the left before crashing 65 metres away. Another video was streamed live on Facebook by Sonu Jaiswal, a passenger on the plane, before and during the crash. The video shows passengers unaware of the situation until seconds before impact.

The crash occurred in Gandaki Province between the old Pokhara Airport and the new Pokhara International Airport, which was opened two weeks earlier and also where the aircraft was intending to land. The accident resulted in the deaths of all 72 people on board, and was Nepal's worst aviation accident since the crash of Pakistan International Airlines Flight 268 in 1992, the deadliest aviation accident in Nepalese domestic aviation, and the deadliest accident involving an ATR 72.

According to an official at the Pokhara International Airport, air traffic control cleared the flight to land on runway 30 heading from east to west, but the captain requested the opposing runway 12 heading from west to east, minutes before the crash. A Civil Aviation Authority of Nepal spokesperson said: "The weather was clear; according to preliminary information the cause of the crash is the technical issue of the plane."

Flight-tracking organisation Flightradar24 noted that during the flight the aircraft had been transmitting inaccurate speed and altitude data.

Aircraft 

The aircraft involved in the crash was a 15-year-old twin-engine turboprop ATR 72-500, with serial number 754 and registration 9N-ANC. It was first delivered to Kingfisher Airlines as VT-KAJ in 2007. In 2013, it was transferred to Nok Air as HS-DRD before being delivered to Yeti Airlines in 2019.

Passengers and crew 
There were 72 people on board, of which 68 were passengers and four were crew members. Among the passengers were 37 men, 25 women, and six children, three of whom were infants. Seventy-one bodies were found. On 17 January, authorities began returning the victims' bodies (the majority of which were burnt beyond recognition) to their families. The United States Department of State announced that two U.S. citizens died in the crash, although Nepalese authorities did not report any American deaths.

The plane was under the command of senior captain Kamal KC with Anju Khatiwada as copilot. Khatiwada's husband, Dipak Pokhrel, who also worked for Yeti Airlines, died in the 2006 Yeti Airlines Twin Otter crash. Khatiwada was set to qualify as a captain upon the successful completion of the flight.

Aftermath 
The airport was closed as authorities launched a rescue operation. The Government of Nepal summoned an emergency cabinet meeting following the crash. Prime Minister Pushpa Kamal Dahal said he was deeply saddened by the tragic accident.

The Office of the Prime Minister declared 16 January to be a national day of mourning to pay respect to those who died in the crash. The flag of Nepal was flown at half-staff. Yeti Airlines cancelled all regular flights scheduled for 16 January.

Investigation

Amit Singh, an experienced pilot and founder of India's Safety Matters Foundation, said that the video from the ground taken moments before the crash, showed the aircraft's nose noticeably high before the left wing suddenly dropped and the plane fell out of sight, probably indicating a stall. A spokesman said that the pilot had not reported "anything untoward" as the plane approached the airport.

A five-member committee headed by Nagendra Ghimire was investigating the crash for the government of Nepal with the participation of the French Bureau of Enquiry and Analysis for Civil Aviation Safety. On 16 January, the flight data and cockpit voice recorders were found and in good condition. The accident's investigation authority in Nepal asked that both recorders be examined in Singapore. 

According to the committee, the data recorders indicated the propellers were feathered. A feathered propeller generates no thrust. On 13 February, the preliminary report was released. The report revealed the plane's pilot said before the crash there was no power from the aircraft's engines.

See also

 List of accidents and incidents involving airliners by airline (P–Z)
 List of accidents and incidents involving commercial aircraft
 List of airplane accidents in Nepal

References

2023 disasters in Nepal
Accidents and incidents involving the ATR 72
Aviation accidents and incidents in 2023
Aviation accidents and incidents in Nepal
Filmed deaths in Asia
January 2023 events in Nepal
Pokhara
Yeti Airlines accidents and incidents
Airliner accidents and incidents caused by stalls